Tom Rakocevic is a Canadian politician, who was elected to the Legislative Assembly of Ontario in the 2018 provincial election, and again recently in the 2022 provincial election. He represents the riding of Humber River—Black Creek as a member of the Ontario New Democratic Party. Rakocevic is the first NDP representative in the riding's history to be re-elected.

He was previously the party's candidate in York West in the provincial elections of 2011 and 2014. Prior to his election to the legislature, he was employed as an executive assistant to Toronto city councillor Anthony Perruzza.

Electoral record

References

Ontario New Democratic Party MPPs
21st-century Canadian politicians
Living people
Canadian people of Serbian descent
Politicians from Toronto
Year of birth missing (living people)